AP Hotels & Resorts–Tavira–SC Farense is a Portuguese professional cycling team, founded in 1979, which is based in Tavira. It is one of the European teams in the UCI Continental Tour. From 2016 until 2019, the team had the commercial designation of, Sporting Clube de Portugal/Tavira, as the result of a sponsorship from Sporting Clube de Portugal.

Team roster

Major wins

1996
Stage 2 Circuito Montañés, Domingo Sánchez
1999
Overall Troféu Joaquim Agostinho, Juan Carlos Guillamón
Stage 1, Juan Carlos Guillamón
Stage 1 GP do Minho, Krassimir Vassiliev
2000
Stage 1 GP Mitsubishi, Krassimir Vassiliev
Stage 1 GP CCRLVT, Domingo Sánchez
2001
Stage 5 Volta a Portugal, Pedro Martins
2002
Stage 3 GP do Minho, Danail Petrov
Stage 10 Volta a Portugal, Danail Petrov
2003
Stage 3 Tour de Normandie, Krassimir Vassiliev
 Time Trial Championships, Joaquim Andrade
Stage 3 GP CTT Correios de Portugal, David Blanco
2004
Stage 4 GP Estremadura, Joaquim Andrade
Stage 4 Volta ao Alentejo, Krassimir Vassiliev
Stage 4 Tour of Bulgaria, Nelson Vitorino
2005
Prologue (ITT) Tour de Normandie, Martín Garrido
Stage 5 Tour de Normandie, Juan Olmo
Stages 2b, 3, 6 & 7 Tour of Bulgaria, Martín Garrido
2006
Stage 3 Volta a Portugal, Martín Garrido
Stage 6 Volta a Portugal, Ricardo Mestre
Stage 9 Volta a Portugal, Krassimir Vassiliev
Stage 3 Tour of Bulgaria, Krassimir Vassiliev
Stage 6 Tour of Bulgaria, Martín Garrido
2007
Stage 3 Volta ao Distrito de Santarém, Martín Garrido
Overall GP Paredes Rota dos Moveis, David Blanco
Stage 3, David Blanco
Prologue (ITT) Volta a Portugal, Martín Garrido
2008
Overall Tour de San Luis, Martín Garrido
Prologue (ITT) & Stage 3, Martín Garrido
Stage 4 GP Paredes Rota dos Moveis, Ricardo Mestre
Stage 3 Boucles de la Mayenne, Martín Garrido
Overall Volta a Portugal, David Blanco
2009
Stages 4 & 5 Volta ao Alentejo, Cândido Barbosa
Overall GP Paredes Rota dos Moveis, Cândido Barbosa
Stages 2 & 3, Cândido Barbosa
Overall Volta a Portugal, David Blanco
Prologue (ITT) & Stage 2, Cândido Barbosa
Stages 9 & 10, David Blanco
2010
Overall Volta ao Alentejo, David Blanco
Stage 1, Cândido Barbosa
Stage 3, David Blanco
Overall GP Torres Vedras, Cândido Barbosa
Prologue (ITT) & Stages 2 & 4, Cândido Barbosa
Overall Volta a Portugal, David Blanco
Stages 4 & 7, David Blanco
Stage 10, Cândido Barbosa
Stage 6 Tour of Bulgaria, Ricardo Mestre
2011
Overall GP Torres Vedras, Ricardo Mestre
Stage 1, Ricardo Mestre
 Overall Volta a Portugal, Ricardo Mestre
Stage 7, Ricardo Mestre
Stage 8, André Cardoso
2012
Stage 1 Vuelta a Asturias, Alejandro Marque
 Overall Troféu Joaquim Agostinho, Ricardo Mestre
Stage 3, Ricardo Mestre
Stage 9 (ITT) Volta a Portugal, Alejandro Marque
2014
Stage 3 Volta ao Alentejo, Manuel Cardoso
Stages 1, 7, 8 & 9 Tour du Maroc, Manuel Cardoso
Stage 2 Tour du Maroc, Daniel Mestre
 Time Trial Championships, Igor Silva
 Road Race Championships, Igor Silva
 Under-23 Time Trial Championships, Rafael Reis
Stage 10 Volta a Portugal, Manuel Cardoso
2015
Stage 2 Volta ao Alentejo, Manuel Cardoso
2016
 Overall Troféu Joaquim Agostinho, Rinaldo Nocentini
2017
Stage 1 Volta ao Alentejo, Rinaldo Nocentini
2018
Stages 3 & 6 La Tropicale Amissa Bongo, Rinaldo Nocentini
Stage 3 GP Beiras e Serra da Estrela, Mario Gonzalez
Overall Tour of China II, Alejandro Marque
2021
Stage 3 Volta a Portugal, Alejandro Marque

References

External links
 

Cycling teams based in Portugal
UCI Continental Teams (Europe)
Cycling teams established in 1979